The South Korean women's national ice hockey team is controlled by the Korea Ice Hockey Association (KIHA). In 2017, the team was promoted to Division IB after winning the Division IIA World Women's Ice Hockey Championships. As of 2022, the team was ranked 18th in the world.

The South Korean women's national team competed in the 2018 Pyeongchang Winter Olympics after being granted automatic entry as the host country by the IIHF. In an effort to boost their competitiveness for the Olympics, the program has recruited several North American players with Korean ancestry. In January 2018, it was announced that a unified Korean team would take part in the games, including players from North Korea. KIHA president Chung Mong-won hired Sarah Murray to coach the team.

A movie about the South Korean women's ice hockey team was released in South Korea in August 2016.

Tournament record

Olympic Games
2018 – Host country (as Unified Korea Team), Finished in 8th place

World Championships
In 2004 the South Korean women's hockey team was the first time involved in the World Championship competition.

2004 – Finished in 27th place (6th in Division III, Demoted to Division IV)
2005 – Finished in 27th place (1st in Division IV, Promoted to Division III)
2007 – Finished in 26th place (5th in Division III)
2008 – Finished in 28th place (6th in Division III, Demoted to Division IV)
2009 – Division IV canceled
2011 – Finished in 27th place (2nd in Division IV)
2012 – Finished in 28th place (3rd in Division IIB)
2013 – Finished in 27th place (1st in Division IIB, Promoted to Division IIA)
2014 – Finished in 23rd place (3rd in Division IIA)
2015 – Finished in 23rd place (3rd in Division IIA)
2016 – Finished in 22nd place (2nd in Division IIA)
2017 – Finished in 21st place (1st in Division IIA, Promoted to Division IB)
2018 – Finished in 17th place (2nd in Division IB)
2019 – Finished in 18th place (2nd in Division IB)
2020 – Cancelled due to the COVID-19 pandemic
2021 – Cancelled due to the COVID-19 pandemic
2022 – Finished in 20th place (5th in Division IB)

Asian Games
1999 – Finished in 4th place
2007 – Finished in 5th place
2011 – Finished in 5th place
2017 – Finished in 4th place

IIHF Challenge Cup of Asia
 2011 – 3rd  
 2012 – 4th
 2014 – 3rd

All-time record against other nations
Last match update: 11 March 2022

Team

Current roster
The roster for the 2022 IIHF Women's World Championship Division I Group B tournament.

Head coach: Kim Sang-junAssistant coaches: Kwak Hyung-ki, Shin So-jung

Further reading

References

External links

IIHF profile

Ice hockey
Korea, South
Ice hockey teams in South Korea
National team